The 2016 CIS Men's University Cup Hockey Tournament (54th Annual) was held March 17–20, 2016 in Halifax, Nova Scotia. It was the second of two consecutive CIS Championships to be held at the Scotiabank Centre in Halifax.

Saint Mary's University was the designated host for this championship as St. Francis Xavier University was the host in 2015 (at the same venue). The St. Francis Xavier X-Men did qualify for this event by winning the AUS Championships.

This was the most successful tournament for attendance setting a new record of 43,513. It also proved to be the last Men's University Cup that was branded as a CIS championship. On October 20, 2016, Canadian Interuniversity Sport, the country's governing body for university athletics and the organizer of the University Cup, changed its name to U Sports.

Road to the Cup

AUS playoffs

There was no Bronze Medal (3rd place) series as Saint Mary's did not advance to the AUS Finals and as such would take the host spot.

OUA playoffs

Canada West playoffs

University Cup tournament
The eight teams to advance to the tournament are listed below. The three(3) conference champions must be seeded 1-3 followed by the OUA Runner-up (seed #4). The remaining four seeds are for the AUS Finalist, Canada West Finalist, OUA Third-place and host. Their seedings are based on the pre-tournament rankings.

Tournament format
The tournament is a traditional 8 team - Single Elimination ladder with bronze medal game between the two Semi-final losers. Games that are tied after regulation play a 10min Overtime period following the 3rd period. If there is no score after the first overtime, the ice is cleaned and they will play 20min periods (with ice cleaned between periods) until there is a winner.

The higher seed is the 'Home' team for each game (the home team must wear their 'white' jerseys and will get the last change during stoppages of play).

The UNB Varsity Reds played as the visitor in games 1 and 3 and as the home team in game 2. St. Francis Xavier X-Men were the opposite; the home team for games 1 and 3 and the visitor in game 2.

Overtime
Games that ended in a regulation tie would be resolved solely on 5-on-5 overtime (5 skaters and a goalie for each side) until one team scored. The first overtime period would be 10min and would start after a 3min rest. Following this period, the ice would be cleaned and subsequent 20min periods would be played.

The first game of the tournament set a record for the longest game every played at the tournament ending in a 3-2 quadruple overtime victory for the Saskatchewan Huskies over the Carleton Ravens. The total time was 116:11 (60+10+20+20+6:11), 4 minutes short of 2 complete games. The previous record was 103:17 and occurred in 2002 when Western won 4-3 in triple overtime over UQTR in the championship final. The longest game ever in the CIS occurred February 27, 2011 between the host UNB Varsity Reds and visiting Acadia Axemen in game one of their best of 5 second round AUS playoff series (AUS Semi-finals). UNB won 3-2 in quadruple overtime ending at 11:53 of the 4th overtime period - 121:53 (60+10+20+20+11:53).

The semi-final match between Saskatchewan Huskies and St. Francis Xavier X-Men also went into overtime. St. Francis Xavier X-Men won 3-2 in triple overtime. The total time was 107:35 (60+10+20+17:35).

As a result of playing in the longest University Cup game in history and a subsequent triple overtime game, in game #2 (the second longest game in tournament history), the Saskatchewan Huskies finished the tournament having played 283:46 minutes (116:11+107:35+60) when including their play in the bronze medal game. This totals 4.7 games, close to 2 more games than expected in a 3-game tournament.

Bronze game

Championship final

Tournament All-Stars
Philippe Halley, from the UNB Varsity Reds, was selected as the Major W.J. 'Danny' McLeod Award for CIS University Cup MVP. Halley had 6 goals and 1 assist for 7 points in 3 games. His 6 goals were scored as two consecutive hat-tricks, one each in his first two games of the tournament.

Joining Halley on the tournament all-star team were:
Forward: Anthony Repaci (Saint Mary's Huskies)
Forward: Michael Clarke (St. Francis Xavier X-Men)
Defenceman: Nathan Chiarlitti (St. Francis Xavier X-Men)
Defenceman: Jordan Murray (UNB Varsity Reds)
Goalie: Jordon Cooke (Saskatchewan Huskies)

References

External links
 Tournament Website

U Sports ice hockey
Ice hockey in Nova Scotia
University Cup, 2016
Sport in Halifax, Nova Scotia